Septic shock is a potentially fatal medical condition that occurs when sepsis, which is organ injury or damage in response to infection, leads to dangerously low blood pressure and abnormalities in cellular metabolism. The Third International Consensus Definitions for Sepsis and Septic Shock (Sepsis-3) defines septic shock as a subset of sepsis in which particularly profound circulatory, cellular, and metabolic abnormalities are associated with a greater risk of mortality than with sepsis alone. Patients with septic shock can be clinically identified by requiring  a vasopressor to maintain a mean arterial pressure of 65 mm Hg or greater and having serum lactate level greater than 2 mmol/L (>18 mg/dL) in the absence of hypovolemia. This combination is associated with hospital mortality rates greater than 40%.

The primary infection is most commonly caused by bacteria, but also may be by fungi, viruses or parasites. It may be located in any part of the body, but most commonly in the lungs, brain, urinary tract, skin or abdominal organs. It can cause multiple organ dysfunction syndrome (formerly known as multiple organ failure) and death.

Frequently, people with septic shock are cared for in intensive care units. It most commonly affects children, immunocompromised individuals, and the elderly, as their immune systems cannot deal with infection as effectively as those of healthy adults. The mortality rate from septic shock is approximately 25–50%.

Causes
Septic shock is a result of a systemic response to infection or multiple infectious causes. The precipitating infections that may lead to septic shock if severe enough include but are not limited to appendicitis, pneumonia, bacteremia, diverticulitis, pyelonephritis, meningitis, pancreatitis, necrotizing fasciitis, MRSA and mesenteric ischemia.

According to the earlier definitions of sepsis updated in 2001, sepsis is a constellation of symptoms secondary to an infection that manifests as disruptions in heart rate, respiratory rate, temperature, and white blood cell count. If sepsis worsens to the point of end-organ dysfunction (kidney failure, liver dysfunction, altered mental status, or heart damage), then the condition is called severe sepsis. Once severe sepsis worsens to the point where blood pressure can no longer be maintained with intravenous fluids alone, then the criterion has been met for septic shock.

Pathophysiology
The pathophysiology of septic shock is not entirely understood, but it is known that a key role in the development of severe sepsis is played by an immune and coagulation response to an infection. Both pro-inflammatory and anti-inflammatory responses play a role in septic shock.  Septic shock involves a widespread inflammatory response that produces a hypermetabolic effect. This is manifested by increased cellular respiration, protein catabolism, and metabolic acidosis with a compensatory respiratory alkalosis.

Most cases of septic shock are caused by gram-positive bacteria, followed by endotoxin-producing gram-negative bacteria, although fungal infections are an increasingly prevalent cause of septic shock. Toxins produced by pathogens cause an immune response; in gram-negative bacteria these are endotoxins, which are bacterial membrane lipopolysaccharides (LPS).

Gram-positive
In gram-positive bacteria, these are exotoxins or enterotoxins, which may vary depending on the species of bacteria. These are divided into three types. Type I, cell surface-active toxins, disrupt cells without entering, and include superantigens and heat-stable enterotoxins. Type II, membrane-damaging toxins, destroy cell membranes in order to enter and include hemolysins and phospholipases. Type III, intracellular toxins or A/B toxins interfere with internal cell function and include shiga toxin, cholera toxin, and anthrax lethal toxin. (note that Shigella and Vibrio cholerae are Gram negative organisms).

Gram-negative
In gram-negative sepsis, free LPS attaches to a circulating LPS-binding protein, and the complex then binds to the CD14 receptor on monocytes, macrophages, and neutrophils. Engagement of CD14 (even at doses as minute as 10 pg/mL) results in intracellular signaling via an associated "Toll-like receptor" protein 4 (TLR-4). This signaling results in the activation of nuclear factor kappaB (NF-κB), which leads to transcription of a number of genes that trigger a proinflammatory response. It was the result of significant activation of mononuclear cells and synthesis of effector cytokines. It also results in profound activation of mononuclear cells and the production of potent effector cytokines such as IL-1, IL-6, and TNF-α. TLR-mediated activation helps to trigger the innate immune system to efficiently eradicate invading microbes, but the cytokines they produce also act on endothelial cells. There, they have a variety of effects, including reduced synthesis of anticoagulation factors such as tissue factor pathway inhibitor and thrombomodulin. The effects of the cytokines may be amplified by TLR-4 engagement on endothelial cells.

In response to inflammation, a compensatory reaction of production of anti-inflammatory substances such as IL-4, IL-10 antagonists, IL-1 receptor, and cortisol occurs. This is called compensatory anti-inflammatory response syndrome (CARS).
Both the inflammatory and anti-inflammatory reactions are responsible for the course of sepsis and are described as MARS (Mixed Antagonist Response Syndrome). The aim of these processes is to keep inflammation at an appropriate level. CARS often leads to suppression of the immune system, which leaves patients vulnerable to secondary infection. It was once thought that SIRS or CARS could predominate in a septic individual, and it was proposed that CARS follows SIRS in a two-wave process. It is now believed that the systemic inflammatory response and the compensatory anti-inflammatory response occur simultaneously.

At high levels of LPS, the syndrome of septic shock supervenes; the same cytokine and secondary mediators, now at high levels, result in systemic vasodilation (hypotension), diminished myocardial contractility, widespread endothelial injury, activation causing systemic leukocyte adhesion and diffuse alveolar capillary damage in the lung, and activation of the coagulation system culminating in disseminated intravascular coagulation (DIC).

The hypoperfusion from the combined effects of widespread vasodilation, myocardial pump failure, and DIC causes multiorgan system failure that affects the liver, kidneys, and central nervous system, among other organ systems. Recently, severe damage to liver ultrastructure has been noticed from treatment with cell-free toxins of Salmonella. Unless the underlying infection (and LPS overload) is rapidly brought under control, the patient usually dies.

The ability of TLR4 to respond to a distinct LPS species are clinically important. Pathogenic bacteria may employ LPS with low biological activity to evade proper recognition by the TLR4/MD-2 system, dampening the host immune response and increasing the risk of bacterial dissemination. On the other hand, such LPS would not be able to induce septic shock in susceptible patients, rendering septic complications more manageable. Yet, defining and understanding how even the smallest structural differences between the very similar LPS species may affect the activation of the immune response may provide the mechanism for the fine tuning of the latter and new insights to immunomodulatory processes.

Diagnosis

According to current guidelines, requirements for diagnosis with sepsis are "the presence (probable or documented) of infection together with systemic manifestations of infection". These manifestations may include:
 Tachypnea (fast rate of breathing), which is defined as more than 20 breaths per minute, or when testing blood gas, a  less than 32 mm Hg, which signifies hyperventilation
 White blood cell count either significantly low (< 4000 cells/mm3), or elevated (> 12000 cells/mm3)
 Tachycardia (rapid heart rate), which in sepsis is defined as a rate greater than 90 beats per minute
 Altered body temperature: Fever >  or hypothermia < 

Documented evidence of infection, may include positive blood culture, signs of pneumonia on chest x-ray, or other radiologic or laboratory evidence of infection. Signs of end-organ dysfunction are present in septic shock, including kidney failure, liver dysfunction, changes in mental status, or elevated serum lactate.

Septic shock is diagnosed if there is low blood pressure (BP) that does not respond to treatment. This means that intravenous fluid administration alone is not enough to maintain a patient's BP. Diagnosis of septic shock is made when systolic blood pressure is less than 90 mm Hg, a mean arterial pressure (MAP) is less than 70 mm Hg, or a systolic BP decrease of 40 mm Hg or more without other causes for low BP.

Definition
Septic shock is a subclass of distributive shock, a condition in which abnormal distribution of blood flow in the smallest blood vessels results in inadequate blood supply to the body tissues, resulting in ischemia and organ dysfunction. Septic shock refers specifically to distributive shock due to sepsis as a result of infection.

Septic shock may be defined as sepsis-induced low blood pressure that persists despite treatment with intravenous fluids. Low blood pressure reduces tissue perfusion pressure, causing the tissue hypoxia that is characteristic of shock. Cytokines released in a large scale inflammatory response result in massive vasodilation, increased capillary permeability, decreased systemic vascular resistance, and low blood pressure. Finally, in an attempt to offset decreased blood pressure, ventricular dilatation and myocardial dysfunction occur.

Septic shock may be regarded as a stage of SIRS (Systemic Inflammatory Response Syndrome), in which sepsis, severe sepsis and multiple organ dysfunction syndrome (MODS) represent different stages of a pathophysiological process. If an organism cannot cope with an infection, it may lead to a systemic response - sepsis, which may further progress to severe sepsis, septic shock, organ failure, and eventually, result in death.

Treatment
Treatment primarily consists of the following:
 Giving intravenous fluids
 Early antibiotic administration 
 Early goal directed therapy
 Rapid source identification and control
 Support of major organ dysfunction

Fluids
Because lowered blood pressure in septic shock contributes to poor perfusion, fluid resuscitation is an initial treatment to increase blood volume. Patients demonstrating sepsis-induced hypoperfusion should be initially resuscitated with at least 30 ml/kg of intravenous crystalloid within the first three hours. Crystalloids such as normal saline and lactated Ringer's solution are recommended as the initial fluid of choice, while the use of colloid solutions such as hydroxyethyl starch have not shown any advantage or decrease in mortality. When large quantities of fluids are given, administering albumin has shown some benefit. However, too high of a rate of fluid infusion can be more risky; the particular type of fluid's flow rate must be closely monitored, along with the patient's condition and vital signs.

Antibiotics
Treatment guidelines call for the administration of broad-spectrum antibiotics within the first hour following recognition of septic shock. Prompt antimicrobial therapy is important, as risk of dying increases by approximately 10% for every hour of delay in receiving antibiotics. Time constraints do not allow the culture, identification, and testing for antibiotic sensitivity of the specific microorganism responsible for the infection. Therefore, combination antimicrobial therapy, which covers a wide range of potential causative organisms, is tied to better outcomes.  Antibiotics should be continued for 7–10 days in most patients, though treatment duration may be shorter or longer depending on clinical response.

Vasopressors
Among the choices for vasopressors, norepinephrine is superior to dopamine in septic shock. Norepinephrine is the preferred vasopressor, while epinephrine may be added to norepinephrine when needed. Low-dose vasopressin also may be used as an addition to norepinephrine, but is not recommended as a first-line treatment. Dopamine may cause rapid heart rate and arrhythmias, and is only recommended in combination with norepinephrine in those with slow heart rate and low risk of arrhythmia. In the initial treatment of low blood pressure in septic shock, the goal of vasopressor treatment is a mean arterial pressure (MAP) of 65 mm Hg. In 2017, the FDA approved angiotensin II injection for intravenous infusion to increase blood pressure in adults with septic or other distributive shock.

Methylene blue

Methylene blue has been found to be useful for this condition. Although use of methylene blue has mostly been in adults it has also been shown to work in children. Its mechanism of action is thought to be via the inhibition of the nitric oxide-cyclic guanosine monophosphate pathway. This pathway is excessively activated in septic shock. Methylene blue has been found to work in cases resistant to the usual agents. This effect was first reported in the early 1990s.

Other

While there is tentative evidence for β-Blocker therapy to help control heart rate, evidence is not significant enough for its routine use. There is tentative evidence that steroids may be useful in improving outcomes.

Tentative evidence exists that Polymyxin B-immobilized fiber column hemoperfusion may be beneficial in treatment of septic shock. Trials are ongoing and it is currently being used in Japan and Western Europe.

Recombinant activated protein C (drotrecogin alpha) in a 2011 Cochrane review was found not to decrease mortality and to increase bleeding, and thus, was not recommended for use. Drotrecogin alfa (Xigris), was withdrawn from the market in October 2011.

Epidemiology
Sepsis has a worldwide incidence of more than 20 million cases a year, with mortality due to septic shock reaching up to 50 percent even in industrialized countries.

According to the U.S. Centers for Disease Control, septic shock is the thirteenth leading cause of death in the United States and the most frequent cause of death in intensive care units. There has been an increase in the rate of septic shock deaths in recent decades, which is attributed to an increase in invasive medical devices and procedures, increases in immunocompromised patients, and an overall increase in elderly patients.

Tertiary care centers (such as hospice care facilities) have 2-4 times the rate of bacteremia than primary care centers, 75% of which are hospital-acquired infections.

The process of infection by bacteria or fungi may result in systemic signs and symptoms that are variously described. Approximately 70% of septic shock cases were once traceable to gram-negative bacteria that produce endotoxins, however, with the emergence of MRSA and the increased use of arterial and venous catheters, gram-positive bacteria are implicated approximately as commonly as bacilli. In rough order of increasing severity these are, bacteremia or fungemia; sepsis, severe sepsis or sepsis syndrome; septic shock, refractory septic shock, multiple organ dysfunction syndrome, and death.

35% of septic shock cases derive from urinary tract infections, 15% from the respiratory tract, 15% from skin catheters (such as IVs), and more than 30% of all cases are idiopathic in origin.

The mortality rate from sepsis, especially if it is not treated rapidly with the needed medications in a hospital, is approximately 40% in adults and 25% in children. It is significantly greater when sepsis is left untreated for more than seven days.

References

External links

Medical emergencies
Intensive care medicine
Causes of death
Sepsis